Kilbuck Township is a township in Allegheny County, Pennsylvania, United States. The population was 774 at the 2020 census.

Kilbuck Township was named after Gelelemend, also known as Killbuck.

Geography 

Education 
Kilbuck Township is served by the Avonworth School District.

Surrounding and adjacent neighborhoods 
Kilbuck Township has eight land borders, including Glenfield and Aleppo Township to the west, Ohio Township to the north, Ross Township to the east, Avalon and Ben Avon Heights to the southeast, and Ben Avon, and Emsworth to the south.  Across the Ohio River to the south, Kilbuck Township runs adjacent with Neville Township.

Government and Politics

Councilmembers 
[2017-2019] Republicans-1(Fader), Democrats-1(Valois), Multiparty-1(Tomaro), Unknown-1(Dilmore)

Demographics 

At the 2000 census there were 723 people, 310 households, and 217 families living in the township.  The population density was 284.2 people per square mile (109.9/km).  There were 318 housing units at an average density of 125.0/sq mi (48.3/km).  The racial makeup of the township was 98.89% White, 0.55% African American, 0.14% Asian, and 0.41% from two or more races. Hispanic or Latino of any race were 0.14%.

There were 310 households, 26.8% had children under the age of 18 living with them, 63.2% were married couples living together, 4.2% had a female householder with no husband present, and 30.0% were non-families. 25.5% of households were made up of individuals, and 11.9% were one person aged 65 or older.  The average household size was 2.33 and the average family size was 2.81.

The age distribution was 20.2% under the age of 18, 3.7% from 18 to 24, 24.5% from 25 to 44, 31.1% from 45 to 64, and 20.5% 65 or older.  The median age was 46 years. For every 100 females, there were 104.8 males.  For every 100 females age 18 and over, there were 101.0 males.

The median household income was $50,903 and the median family income  was $60,795. Males had a median income of $44,688 versus $30,556 for females. The per capita income for the township was $32,582.  About 3.2% of families and 6.2% of the population were below the poverty line, including 6.2% of those under age 18 and 5.1% of those age 65 or over.

References 

Pittsburgh metropolitan area
Townships in Allegheny County, Pennsylvania
Townships in Pennsylvania